Ramanatham  and Tholudur or Thozhudur, (meaning "Distant Village"), are twin towns by the Vellar River in Cuddalore District, Tamil Nadu, India.

Ramanatham has schools and a post office. There are also private schools and colleges. All major hotels, banks, shopping center, bus stands, marriage halls, petrol/diesel/gas stations are located on Ramanatham highway, as Tholudur is popularly known for its traditional house.

People often refer Ramanatham bus stand as Tholudur stop – however, Tholudur is 5 km away from this Ramanatham highway bus stop. This is due to British rule as during their time they referred to this place as Tholudur instead of Ramanatham. For locals it is a twin town.

The main occupation of the people is agriculture. Rice, sugarcane, groundnut, sweet corn and other cereals are cultivated. Cricket, Kabbadi and badminton have been popular for decades.

The higher secondary school boasts a variety of trees. Nearby is a Chivan (Sivan) temple with inscriptions of the Chola dynasty.

Location

Ramanatham – Tholudur towns are located on the banks of Vellar River. Ramanatham is situated on NH 45 the highway connecting the state capital Chennai and Trichy cities – Tholudur is 5 km from Ramanatham main road. Also, it is 15 km far from the nearest town panchayat, Tittakudi, which is also its Taluk. Ramanatham – Tholudur is 246 km away from Chennai and 76 km away from Trichy.

Ramanatham
 Aadhar Card Center
 Vishan computer education and tech
 VAO Office
 Vellar River Dam (to separate the water to Wellington Lake and Vellar River)

Tholudur

 Primary Health Centre
 Higher Secondary School (with cricket ground) 
 Girls' High School 
 PDS centre

Schools 

List of schools that serve people as below.

 Government Higher Secondary School 
 Girls' High School
 National Matric School 
 O.P.R. Nursery & Primary School
 Elementary and Middle School – Ramanatham

Commerce and landmarks in Ramanatham 

 Kuppusamy Thirumana Mandabam
 American Mahal Thirumana Mandabam
 Santhi Mahal Thirumana Mandabam
 Vishan Computer Education
 NeelaRam Shopping Center
 Vinayagar Temple
 Lamcy Shopping Center
 Mosques
 Church

Private colleges

 Dr. Navalar Nedunchezhiyan College of Engineering
 Sree Arumugam Polytechnic College
 Sree Arumugam Arts and Science College
 Sree Arumugham College of Education
 Sree Arumugam Teacher Training Institute
 Sree Renga Teacher Training Institute

Festivals

Each temple has its own festivals.

Pongal is the main festival and lasts four days.
 Bhogi is celebrated without pollution and with kozhukattai, El-Urundai, etc.
 Pongal is for delicious pongal.
 Mattu Pongal features decorated cattle being fed pongal. 
 Kaanum Pongal is to see people and play on the riverbed. This day is for non-vegetarian food.
 Diwali
 Ramzan
 Christmas

References

Villages in Cuddalore district